Alees Thomas Samaan (sometimes spelled as Alice) is a Bahraini politician and former ambassador to the United Kingdom. She was the first woman to chair a parliament in the Middle East when in April 2005 she chaired Bahrain's upper house of parliament, the Consultative Council. Samaan was one of four women to sit in the Consultative Council. 

She belongs to the native Bahraini Christian community.

In March 2015, Samaan was awarded the Grassroot Diplomat Initiative Honouree for making it her priority to reconcile the people and bring them together. She became the first female Gulf Cooperation Council Ambassador to the UK. In 2002 Ms. Samaan became one of six women appointed to the Shura Council and later made history in the Arab world in 2005 by becoming the first woman to chair a session of Parliament in the region. Covered by the global media, the incident was viewed as a sign of gradual progress towards a more open democracy in Bahrain.

References

External links
Ms Saman's CV on Bahrain's parliament website

Year of birth missing (living people)
Living people
Members of the Consultative Council (Bahrain)
Bahraini Christians
Bahraini women in politics
Bahraini people of Syrian descent
Ambassadors of Bahrain to the United Kingdom
21st-century Bahraini women politicians
Women ambassadors
Bahraini women diplomats
21st-century Bahraini politicians